Duisburg-Meiderich Ost is a railway station in Duisburg, North Rhine-Westphalia, Germany.

The Station
The station is located on the Oberhausen–Duisburg-Ruhrort railway and is served by RB services operated by NordWestBahn.

Train services
The following services currently call at Duisburg-Meiderich Ost:

References

Buildings and structures in Duisburg
Railway stations in North Rhine-Westphalia
Transport in Duisburg